Leo Ruickbie is a British historian and sociologist of religion, specializing in exceptional experiences, paranormal beliefs, magic, witchcraft and Wicca. He is the author of several books, beginning with Witchcraft Out of the Shadows, a 2004 publication outlining the history of witchcraft from ancient Greece until the modern day. Ruickbie was born in Scotland and  took a master's degree in Sociology and Religion at the University of Lancaster. He then studied at King's College London and was an awarded a PhD for his thesis entitled The Re-Enchanters: Theorising Re-Enchantment and Testing for its Presence in Modern Witchcraft.  On Samhain 2007 he launched Open Source Wicca, a project inspired by the open-source software movement aimed at making the founding texts of Wicca more readily available by releasing them under a Creative Commons licence. In 2008 and 2009 he exhibited on the subject of witchcraft in France. He is also a council member of the Society for Psychical Research, a professional member of the Parapsychological Association, the European Society for the Study of Western Esotericism, is on the committee of the Gesellschaft für Anomalistik. In 2021, he was elected a Fellow of the Royal Historical Society and in 2022 a Fellow of the Royal Anthropological Institute. He is the current editor of the Magazine of the Society for Psychical Research.

Bibliography

Books

Witchcraft Out of the Shadows (2004)
Witchcraft Out of the Shadows begins with a survey of historical influences from classical times, northern European paganism, and medieval and early modern Europe. It then describes the roots of modern neopagan witchcraft in groups such as the Hermetic Order of the Golden Dawn and individuals such as Aleister Crowley and Doreen Valiente. Particularly important is the critical analysis of the claims made by Gerald Gardner about Wicca, as well as a detailed discussion of the liturgical content of Gardner's Ye Bok of Ye Art Magical and its sources.

The final part of the book is an overview of modern neo-pagan witchcraft belief and practice, drawing principally on Ruickbie's own doctoral research. Using both original research and secondary analysis of a broad range of anthropological and sociological findings, Ruickbie gives estimates for the numbers of people involved in neo-pagan witchcraft in the UK, their age, gender and income distribution. He also asked participants in his own research about the nature of their religious experience, their relationship with the gods, their practice of magic and their beliefs about its effects.

Witchcraft Out of the Shadows was listed under 'Further Reading' in Owen Davies' 2009 book Grimoires: A History of Magic Books.

The Re-Enchanters (2005)
The Re-Enchanters: Theorising Re-Enchantment and Testing for its Presence in Modern Witchcraft is a sociological analysis of modern witchcraft (including Wicca) that builds a theory of re-enchantment using Max Weber's famous disenchantment hypothesis and then tests this using a sample group drawn primarily from practitioners of modern witchcraft and other forms of contemporary paganism.

Open Source Wicca: The Gardnerian Tradition (2007)
Original ritual texts of the Wiccan Gardnerian Tradition from 1949 to 1961, released under a Creative Commons Attribution-Share Alike licence similar to that which is used in the open-source software community.

Faustus: The Life and Times of a Renaissance Magician (2009)
Biography of Faustus (aka Faust) published by The History Press presents new information on the life and death of Faustus. Pagan Dawn magazine said of the book: 'Leo Ruickbie's solid tome does something unexpected. It rehabilitates someone with one of the worst reputations in history; Georgius Sabellicus Faustus Jnr, better known as Faust'.

A Brief Guide to the Supernatural (2012)
An introduction to supernatural phenomena, beliefs and experiences published by Constable & Robinson.

A Brief Guide to Ghost Hunting (2013)
A  detailed examination of the history and practice of ghost hunting also published by Constable & Robinson. Reviewing the book for the Magonia Review of Books, Peter Rogerson called it 'comprehensive and remarkable good value for the price', adding that 'this is an interesting and useful book one can recommend to ghost hunters and psychical researchers'. It is recommended reading by the chairman of the Ghost Club and Rosemary Ellen Guiley.

The Impossible Zoo: An Encyclopedia of Fabulous Beasts and Mythical Monsters (2016)
From the publisher's website: "The Impossible Zoo is a biology of the supernatural - a study of the life of things that never lived. This world of mermaids and unicorns, now confined to fantasy, but once believed to exist, is a world of the imagination that still affects us today. Wonderfully illustrated throughout, it also provides sources as a guide to further study and exploration." It is recommended by Dr Karl Shuker and Revd Lionel Fanthorpe, FRSA, author and president of the Association for the Scientific Study of Anomalous Phenomena. The book has been translated into Estonian and is published by Tänapäev.

Angels in the Trenches: Spiritualism, Superstition and the Supernatural During the First World War (2018)
A narrative history of the First World War examining paranormal beliefs and experiences both on the Home Front and the Frontline. Published by Robinson, an imprint of Little, Brown for the Centenary of the Armistice in November 2018.

Articles
 'Weber and the Witches: Sociological Theory and Modern Witchcraft', JASANAS, 2 (February 2006), 116–130.
 'Is it Time to Sell Your Soul?', Pagan Dawn, 171, (Beltane 2009), 22–23.
 'Haiti's "Devil Pact"', Paranormal, 46 (April 2010), 10.
 'Sympathy from the Devil', Paranormal, 49 (July 2010), 56–59.
 'Talk of the Devil: Part 1', Paranormal, 51 (September 2010), 28–33.
 'Talk of the Devil: Part 2', Paranormal, 52 (October 2010), 34–39.
 'Child Witches: From Imaginary Cannibalism to Ritual Abuse', Paranthropology, 3.3 (July 2012), pp. 13–21.

Exhibitions

La Sorcellerie en France
This public exhibition explored the history of witchcraft in France with a special focus on the Ardennes region. In a series of highly illustrated panels it covered topics such as what is witchcraft, where was witchcraft to be found, the Knights Templar, Joan of Arc, Gilles de Rais, the legal and theoretical writers on demonology, famous demonic possession cases, legends of the Ardennes, witch trials in the Ardennes, plants used in witchcraft and stones (precious and semi-precious) used in magic, popular superstitions like the horseshoe and Wicca.

It was held at the following locations:
 15–29 June 2008, Bureau de Tourisme, Le Colombier, Place du Colombier, Mouzon, Ardennes, Champagne-Ardenne, France.
 02 - 24 August 2008, Salle des Fêtes, Saint-Antoine, Gers, Midi-Pyrénées, France.
 21–22 March 2009, Printemps des légendes, Monthermé, Ardennes.

Television

Mysteries at the Castle
Ruickbie has appeared in two episodes of Mysteries at the Castle, Season 3:

3.7: "Prince's Plight; Mad King Ludwig; Falling for Love". Here he talked about Dunrobin Castle, Scotland, said to be haunted by the ghost of 'Lady Margaret'

3.9: "Deadliest Chess Game; Gustav III Assassination; Shot in the Heart", in which he presented Ruthven Barracks, Scotland, where Alexander Stewart, Earl of Buchan was said to have played chess with the Devil.

He also appeared in one episode of Mysteries at the Castle, Season 2:

2.3: "Faust; Pirate Queen; First Versailles".

See also
 Johann Georg Faust
 Disenchantment
 Witchcraft and children

References

External links
 Leo Ruickbie's education and research website specialising in witchcraft and Wicca
 Leo Ruickbie, Weber and the Witches
 Witchcraft Out of the Shadows (Publisher's website)
 Faustus: The Life and Times of a Renaissance Magician (Publisher's website)

Year of birth missing (living people)
Living people
Alumni of King's College London
Scottish male writers
Scottish non-fiction writers
Scottish occult writers
Scottish sociologists
Male non-fiction writers
Pagan studies scholars
Parapsychologists
Writers from Edinburgh